Juan Leon Jimenez Molina (born 4 May 1953) is a Costa Rican chess FIDE Master (FM), four-times Costa Rican Chess Championship winner (1972, 1975, 1977, 1978).

Biography 
In the 1970s Juan Leon Jimenez Molina was one of the leading chess players in Costa Rica. He four times won Costa Rican Chess Championships: 1972, 1975, 1977, and 1978. In 1975 in El Salvador Juan Leon Jimenez Molina participated in World Chess Championships Caribbean-Central American Zonal tournament and shared 9th-10th place. 

Juan Leon Jimenez Molina played for Costa Rica in the Chess Olympiad:
 In 1976, at third board in the 22nd Chess Olympiad in Haifa (+5, =4, -1),
 In 2006, at second reserve board in the 37th Chess Olympiad in Turin (+1, =0, -2).

Juan Leon Jimenez Molina played for Costa Rica in the World Student Team Chess Championships:
 In 1976, at third board in the 21st World Student Team Chess Championship in Caracas (+2, =7, -1),
 In 1977, at second board in the 22nd World Student Team Chess Championship in Mexico City (+3, =4, -4).

References

External links

1953 births
Living people
Costa Rican chess players
Chess FIDE Masters
Chess Olympiad competitors